South of Delia is the seventh solo album by American folk singer-songwriter Richard Shindell.  South of Delia is a cover album. Although he himself is sometimes described as a "songwriter's songwriter," covers are not new to Shindell.  In addition to recording a few on his previous solo albums, he was also one third of the folk supergroup / cover band Cry Cry Cry (along with Dar Williams and Lucy Kaplansky).  On South of Delia, Shindell covers songs from several songwriting legends, including Woody Guthrie and Bob Dylan, as well as some from younger up-and-coming writer/performers, such as Jeffrey Foucault and Josh Ritter.

Although the official release date was May 10, 2007, pre-orders began shipping in late March. The album began to appear on a number of radio airplay charts prior to its official release (see below).

The title "South of Delia" comes from a line in the Josh Ritter song, "Lawrence, KS".  The song was previously recorded by Ritter for his 2001 album, Golden Age of Radio.

Track listing 

 "Acadian Driftwood" (Robbie Robertson) – 5:33
Richard Shindell – vocal, bouzouki, acoustic guitar
 Larry Campbell – pedal steel
 Lucy Kaplansky – harmony
 Radoslav Lorković – accordion
 Dennis McDermott – drums
 Sara Milonovich – violin, harmony
 Lincoln Schleifer – electric bass
 Ben Wittman – triangle
 "Señor (Tales of Yankee Power)" (Bob Dylan) – 4:53
 Richard Shindell – vocal, bouzouki, electric slide guitar
 Greg Anderson – piano
 Viktor Krauss – upright bass, bass harmonics
 Dennis McDermott – snare drum, cymbal
 David Sancious – hammond b3
 "The Humpback Whale" (Harry Robertson) – 4:56
 Richard Shindell – vocal, nylon string guitar, cajón peruano, cymbal
 Richard Thompson – electric guitar
 Viktor Krauss – upright bass
 "Born in the U.S.A." (Bruce Springsteen) – 3:06
Richard Shindell – vocal, bouzouki, keyboard, harmony
 Greg Anderson – mandolin
 Larry Campbell – electric guitar
 Mark Dann – electric bass
 Radoslav Lorković – harmonium
 Dennis McDermott – drums
 Ben Wittman – tambourine, cymbal
 "Mercy Street" (Peter Gabriel) – 4:18
 Richard Shindell – vocal, bouzouki, piano, electric guitar, cajón peruano
 Greg Anderson – electric bass
 Lucy Kaplansky – harmony
 Sara Milonovich – low whistle, harmony
 "The Storms Are on the Ocean" (A.P. Carter) – 3:19
 Richard Shindell – vocal, acoustic guitar, bouzouki
 Sara Milonovich – violin, harmony
 Viktor Krauss – upright bass
 Ben Wittman – snare drum
 "Northbound 35" (Jeffrey Foucault) – 5:18
 Richard Shindell – vocal, acoustic guitar, electric guitar, cajón peruano
 Greg Anderson – electric bass
 Lucy Kaplansky – harmony
 Sara Milonovich – violin
 David Sancious – piano
 "Sitting on Top of the World" (trad arr Shindell) – 3:05
 Richard Shindell – vocal, electric guitar, foot
 "Texas Rangers" (trad arr Shindell) – 4:09
 Richard Shindell – vocal, bouzouki, electric guitar
 Viktor Krauss – upright bass
 Dennis McDermott – tom-toms, drum heads, bodhrán, cymbals
 Richard Thompson – lead guitar
 Tony Trischka – banjo
 Ben Wittman – snare drum, garbage can
 "Deportee (Plane Wreck at Los Gatos)" (words: Woody Guthrie, music: Martin Hoffman)  – 5:06
 Richard Shindell – vocal, acoustic guitar, electric guitar
 Eliza Gilkyson – harmony
 Mark Hallman – harmony
 Radoslav Lorković – hammond b3
 Dennis McDermott – drums
 Lincoln Schleifer – electric bass
 "Solo le Pido a Dios" (Leon Gieco) – 4:41
 Richard Shindell – vocal, harmony vocals, acoustic guitar, electric guitar, mountain dulcimer, tambourine, bombo leguero
 Pablo Aslan – upright bass
 Leon Gieco – harmony
 Lisa Gutkin – violin
 Analia Sirio – harmony
 "Lawrence, KS" (Josh Ritter) – 4:10
 Richard Shindell – vocal, bouzouki, electric guitar, tambourine, cymbal
 Greg Anderson – electric bass
 Larry Campbell – pedal steel
 Lucy Kaplansky – harmony
 Dennis McDermott – drums
 Sara Milonovich – violin, harmony

Charts

References

External links 
 Take Five Podcast, [Richard Shindell interview with John Platt], WFUV

2007 albums
Covers albums
Richard Shindell albums